Frederick Henry Mueller (November 22, 1893 – August 31, 1976) was a U.S. cabinet officer.  He served as the United States Secretary of Commerce from 1959 until 1961, during the administration of President Dwight D. Eisenhower.

Early life 
Mueller was born in Grand Rapids, Michigan, the son of Emma Matilde Oesterle and furniture manufacturer John Frederick Mueller.

Education 
He graduated from Michigan State University in 1914, with a bachelor's degree in mechanical engineering.

Career 
Upon his father's retirement, he became president of the family business.

Prior to joining the Eisenhower administration, Mueller served in multiple posts at the Department of Commerce. In 1956, Mueller was charged with the heading of the Division of Domestic Affairs, and in 1958, he was elevated to deputy secretary, the number two position in the bureau.

Personal life 
He married the former Mary Darrah on November 6, 1915; they had two children, Marcia Joan and Frederick Eugene Mueller.

Death 
Mueller died in Grand Rapids, Michigan, on August 31, 1976, at age 82. He is interred in Graceland Mausoleum in Grand Rapids.

References

External links 
 Papers of Frederick H. Mueller, Dwight D. Eisenhower Presidential Library

Politicians from Grand Rapids, Michigan
United States Secretaries of Commerce
1893 births
1976 deaths
Michigan State University alumni
Eisenhower administration cabinet members
20th-century American politicians
American people of German descent